Muftiship of Kumanovo (Macedonian Cyrillic: Муфтиство Куманово) is one of the 13 muftiships of Islamic Religious Community of Macedonia in Kumanovo, North Macedonia. Current Mufti is Abedin Imeri (Абедин Имери).
New building of the Muftiship was opened on July 11th, 2016. Bursa Mayor Recep Altepe was one of the guests of the ceremony. The construction started on March 20th 2013.

List of Mosques in Kumanovo

See also
Islam in North Macedonia
Macedonian Muslims

References

External links
 kovz.gov.mk
kumanovonews.com Градоначалникот на баклава во ИВЗ 09.09.2010

Kumanovo
Lipkovo Municipality